Carol Page Brown (born April 19, 1953) is an American rower who competed in the 1976 Summer Olympics. She was also a member of the 1980 Olympic team women's eight that did not compete in the Moscow Olympic Games due to the US-led boycott. She was a member of the 1984 Olympic team in Los Angeles.

Biography
Brown rowed for Princeton University and was the founder and three-time captain of the Princeton women's swimming team. She was a member of three All American relay teams (1973 and 1974) one of which set an American record (1973).

Her first US National Team was the 1974 World Championships where she and Princeton teammate Janet Youngholm raced to a fifth-place finish; the first US women's boat to reach a world championship finals. They qualified for the US Team by being National Champions in the pair event racing for Princeton University. At the 1975 World Rowing Championships, Brown won a silver medal with the women's eight.

In 1976 she was a crew member of the American boat that won an Olympic bronze medal in the eight event, the first time women's rowing was on the Olympic program. Brown was a nine-times member of the US National Rowing Team including the 1980 and the 1984 Olympic Teams. She is the holder of three silver and one bronze world championship medals. She won a gold medal at the Henley Royal Regatta in 1981 in the coxed fours. This was the first time women raced at Henley. At the time of her retirement, she held more World Championship medals than any other US woman.

Brown and the other members of the 1980 US Olympic team were awarded the Congressional Gold Medal, the highest civilian award which may be bestowed by the United States Congress. The medals were awarded to record the historical sacrifice the 1980 Olympians made to preserve freedom as well as to record the patriotic role of the 1980 US Olympic Team in the Cold War with the Soviet Union.

Brown was inducted into the US Rowing Hall of Fame in 1991 (1980 women's eight) and a second time in 2016 (1976 women's eight).

She is featured in the book "The Red Rose Crew" by Daniel J. Boyne, the story of the 1975 US women's World Championship eight that won a silver medal.

Brown is currently a Vice President, US Olympians and Paralympians Association (USOPA), the USOC athlete alumni organization.

Brown currently competes in Triathlon - Sprint - Age Group 65-69.
In 2019 She was National Champion and placed 4th at ITU World Championships in Lausanne, Switzerland....the top US finisher.

Personal life
Brown married another Princeton alumni, Lindsay Pomeroy, and they have one son. Their son also attended Princeton and played for the Princeton Tigers men's ice hockey.

See also
 World Fit
 List of Princeton University Olympians
 USA Triathlon ITU World Championships 2019

References

1953 births
Living people
Rowers at the 1976 Summer Olympics
Olympic bronze medalists for the United States in rowing
American female rowers
Medalists at the 1976 Summer Olympics
World Rowing Championships medalists for the United States
21st-century American women